Jasenovo may refer to several places:

 Jasenovo, Slovakia, a village and municipality in Slovakia
 Jasenovo (Nova Varoš), a village in Nova Varoš municipality, Serbia
 Jasenovo, Bela Crkva, a village in Bela Crkva municipality, Serbia
 Jasenovo (Despotovac), a village in Despotovac municipality, Serbia
 Jasenovo, Foča, a village in Foča municipality, Republika Srpska, Bosnia and Herzegovina

See also
 Jasenov (disambiguation)
 Yasenevo (disambiguation)